Orungo virus (ORUV) is an arbovirus of the genus Orbivirus, the subfamily Sedoreovirinae and the family Reoviridae. There are four known subtypes of Orungo virus designated Orungo-1 (ORUV-1), Orungo-2 (ORUV-2), Orungo-3 (ORUV-3), and Orungo-4 (ORUV-4).  It was first isolated by the Uganda Virus Research Institute in Entebbe, Uganda by Oyewale Tomori and colleagues. Antibodies to the virus have been found in humans, monkeys, sheep, and cattle.

References

Orbiviruses